Tillandsia tenuifolia, the narrowleaf airplant, is a species in the genus Tillandsia. This species is widespread across much of South America and the Caribbean islands.

Four varieties are recognized:

Tillandsia tenuifolia var. disticha (L.B.Sm.) L.B.Sm. - States of Rio de Janeiro + São Paulo
Tillandsia tenuifolia var. saxicola (L.B.Sm.) L.B.Sm. - States of Rio de Janeiro + São Paulo
Tillandsia tenuifolia var. tenuifolia - most of species range
Tillandsia tenuifolia var. vaginata (Wawra) L.B.Sm. - Jamaica, Martinique, Brazil, Paraguay

Cultivars
 Tillandsia 'Bingo'
 Tillandsia 'Bonsall Beauty'
 Tillandsia 'Coconut Ice'
 Tillandsia 'Emerald Forest'
 Tillandsia 'Flamingoes'
 Tillandsia 'Gildora'
 Tillandsia 'Green Goddess'
 Tillandsia 'Hoja Gorda'
 Tillandsia 'Perky Pink'
 Tillandsia 'Sexton'
 Tillandsia 'Silver Comb'

References

tenuifolia
Flora of South America
Flora of the Caribbean
Flora of Brazil
Flora of the Atlantic Forest
Plants described in 1753
Taxa named by Carl Linnaeus